Geowulf is an Australian dream pop duo formed in Sunshine Coast, Queensland in 2016. Their debut studio album, Great Big Blue, was released in 2018, and their second studio album, My Resignation, was released on 25 October 2019.

History
In 2017, Geowulf released their debut EP, Relapse, containing four songs including "Saltwater", their first single. "Saltwater" was originally released as a single in 2016, and was a part of the 37 Adventures compilation album Odd Numbers Volume 1.

Geowulf's debut studio album, Great Big Blue, was released on 16 February 2018. Their second studio album, My Resignation, was released on 25 October 2019. The singles "I See Red", "He's 31", "Lonely" and "My Resignation" were all released in advance of the album.

In September 2021, Geowulf released the single "I've Been Over It", their first release of new music in nearly two years. This would be followed by several singles over the next year: "Open Me Up", "Drown", "Lover That Waits" and "Whirlwind". All five singles formed the EP Whirlwind, released on 15 July 2022 to coincide with the single of the same name.

They are currently based in London, England.

In December 2022, Star Kendrick announced that Toma Banjanin would be taking a step back from Geowulf, effectively turning it into Kendrick’s solo musical project. Their single "Must Be a Woman" marked the first Geowulf release without Banjanin.

Members
Star Kendrick
Toma Banjanin

Discography

Studio albums

EPs

Singles
 "Saltwater" (2016)
 "Don't Talk About You" (2017)
 "Won't Look Back" (2017)
 "Get You" (2017)
 "Drink Too Much" (2017)
 "Hideaway" (2017)
 "Sunday" (2018)
 "Teardrops" (2018)
 "I See Red" (2019)
 "He's 31" (2019)
 "Lonely" (2019)
 "My Resignation" (2019)
 "I've Been Over It" (2021)
 "Open Me Up" (2021)
 "Drown" (2022)
 "Lover That Waits" (2022)
 "Whirlwind" (2022)
 "Must Be a Woman" (2022)
 "Lovestruck" (2023)

References

External links
 
 
 

Australian musical duos
Pop music duos
Musical groups established in 2016
Dream pop musical groups
Australian indie pop groups
Lo-fi music groups
PIAS Recordings artists
2016 establishments in Australia